Oakley Chapel African Methodist Episcopal Church is a historic African Methodist Episcopal church located at Tebbetts, Callaway County, Missouri.  It was built in 1878, and is a one-story, frame gable front church on a concrete foundation.  Also on the property are the contributing small cistern (c. 1900) and cemetery. There are approximately 80 known burials in the cemetery.

It was listed on the National Register of Historic Places in 2008.

References 

African-American history of Missouri
African Methodist Episcopal churches in Missouri
Churches on the National Register of Historic Places in Missouri
Churches completed in 1878
Buildings and structures in Callaway County, Missouri
National Register of Historic Places in Callaway County, Missouri